Orange G also called C.I. 16230, Acid Orange 10, or orange gelb is a synthetic azo dye used in histology in many staining formulations. It usually comes as a disodium salt. It has the appearance of orange crystals or powder.

Staining
Orange G is used in the Papanicolaou stain to stain keratin. It is also a major component of the Alexander test for pollen staining.

It is often combined with other yellow dyes and used to stain erythrocytes in the trichrome methods.

Color marker
Orange G can be used as an electrophoretic color marker to monitor the process of agarose gel electrophoresis, running approximately at the size of a 50 Base pair (bp) DNA molecule, and polyacrylamide gel electrophoresis. Bromophenol blue and xylene cyanol can also be used for this purpose. (However, the apparent "size" of all these dyes varies according to the concentration of agarose in the gel and the buffer system used, so one should look up the appropriate reference before using the dyes to determine how far a gel has run.)

pH indicator
Despite its two ionizable groups, it shows only two colors in aqueous solution, brilliant orange in neutral and acidic pH or red in pH greater than 9.

References

Azo dyes
Staining dyes
2-Naphthols
Naphthalenesulfonates
Organic sodium salts
Acid dyes